Chung Woo-taik (Korean: 정우택, born 18 February 1953) is a South Korean politician who served as the former Governor of North Chungcheong from 2006 to 2010. He is currently the Member of the National Assembly for Sangdang since 2022.

Chung is a notable Hoseo-based politician, although his actual birthplace is Busan. He was firstly elected MP in the 1996 election, and served as a 4-term MP from 1996 to 2004, and again from 2012 to 2020; both term in North Chungcheong. Once being a member of the now-defunct Alliance of Liberal Democrats (ALDE) that was a coalition partner to the National Congress for New Politics (NCNP) during the Kim Dae-jung government, he served as the Minister of Oceans and Fisheries from March to September 2001, which he resigned following the ALDE's departure from the government. He then joined to the Grand National Party (GNP) and ran for North Chungcheong governorship at the 2006 local elections and was elected, but failed to retain a second term.

He was the interim President of the Saenuri Party from 16 to 28 December 2016, and its successor, Liberty Korea Party (LKP), from 1 April to 2 July 2017.

Early life and education 
Chung Woo-taik was born in Yeonsan-dong, Busan, South Gyeongsang (now Yeonsan-dong, Yeonje, Busan) on 18 February 1953 amid the Korean War. He was the fourth son to 5 sons and 2 daughters of Park Deuk-ki and Chung Woon-gap, a veteran politician who served as the former Minister of Agriculture and Forestry and a 5-term MP. He attended Kyunggi High School and Sungkyunkwan University, where he graduated with a Bachelor of Laws degree. He studied together with a junior named Hwang Kyo-ahn, who later became the Prime Minister and the interim President.

Political career

Early political career (1992-2001) 
When the Chairman of Hyundai Group Chung Ju-yung founded the Unification National Party (UNP) in 1992, his son, Chung Mong-joon, who was also the then MP for Ulsan East, asked Chung Ji-taik to join politics. He refused it, but instead suggested his younger brother, Chung Woo-taik, to do so. He contested for Jincheon-Eumseong, where he was the UNP Division Chief, at the 1992 election. He quit the party after his defeat at the election.

He was firstly elected to the National Assembly at the 1996 election under the Alliance of Liberal Democrats (ALDE) ticket. The ALDE soon formed an alliance with National Congress for New Politics (NCNP) and nominated Kim Dae-jung as its candidate at the 1997 presidential election. After Kim was elected president, Chung became a member of the Commission on Presidential Transition, representing the ALDE.

Minister of Oceans and Fisheries (2001) 
Following his re-election at the 2000 election, Chung was appointed Minister of Oceans and Fisheries in March 2001. He made total 48 site visits and organised a policy proposal titled "If I am the Minister?", where he accepted various ideas from the employees. Under his ministerial tenure, employees of the Ministry of Oceans and Fisheries took English examinations in order to enhance the quality. He resigned after ALDE withdrew from the cabinet in September 2001.

In Opposition (2001-2005) 
In 2004, the National Assembly voted for the impeachment of Roh Moo-hyun following his remarks that supporting the then de facto ruling Uri Party. Despite the strong boycott of the Uri Party, 193 MPs from the 3 oppositions (GNP, MDP and ALDE) voted in favour of the impeachment, and Chung was one of them (only Lee Nak-yon and Kim Chong-hoh voted against). The event, however, provoked a widespread anger among the people, which let the Uri Party to win the majority (152 out of 300 seats) at the 2004 election. The ALDE only secured 4 seats; Chung was also defeated by Kim Jong-ryul. Following the defeat, he withdrew from the ALDE on 28 May, just 2 days before the beginning of the 17th National Assembly.

Governor of North Chungcheong (2006-2010) 
On 21 September 2005, Chung joined the Grand National Party (GNP). It was reported that he was preparing to run for North Chungcheong governorship at the 2006 local elections.

On 16 April 2006, Chung won GNP preselection, defeating Han Dae-soo and Kim Jin-ho. He was elected, achieving an overwhelming victory amid the high popularity of the party.

During his governorship, North Chungcheong attracted the highest manufacturing investment in South Korea, which is about 21,575,100,000,000 won (≒ ￡13,345,028,604). Chungju, one of the main city of the province, successfully hosted the 2013 World Rowing Championships. He also organised the North Chungcheong Provincial Performing Arts Company, as well as corporate mecenat movements.

His tenure was, however, also faced public criticisms for budget wastes. Several projects i.e. China World, which was supposed to be built in Jecheon or Cheongwon, was cancelled. Cheongju International Airport aviation MRO project, which he promoted during his tenure, was ended up with permanent cancellation after Asiana Airlines officially abandoned it on 29 August 2016. The Democratic Party criticised him for being "hasty" about the project.

On 20 April 2010, Chung launched his bid for re-election at the 2010 election. Although he was leading at opinion polling, he finally lost to Lee Si-jong. His defeat was attributed to factors such as the amendment of Sejong City by the Lee Myung-bak government.

Return to the National Assembly (2012-2016) 
In the 2012 election, Chung contested as the Saenuri candidate for Sangdang and defeated Hong Jae-hyung, the then incumbent MP for the constituency and the Deputy Speaker of the National Assembly, making him to return as an MP after 2004. On 4 May, he made an announcement to run for the Saenuri leadership election on 15 May. He came to the 4th (11.5%) and lost to Hwang Woo-yea, but instead was elected one of the vice presidents.

Interim President of the Saenuri Party/Liberty Korea Party (2016-2017) 
On 16 December 2016, shortly after the National Assembly voted in favour of the impeachment of Park Geun-hye, Chung was elected parliamentary leader of the Saenuri Party, defeating Na Kyung-won. As Lee Jung-hyun resigned as the President of the Saenuri Party on the same day, Chung also became the interim President, which he served until 28 December as he was replaced by In Myung-jin. During his interim presidency, 29 MPs including Kim Moo-sung and Yoo Seong-min left the party; they later formed the Bareun Party.

On 13 February 2017, the Saenuri Party changed its name to the Liberty Korea Party (LKP). On 10 March, the Constitutional Court upheld the impeachment in a unanimous 8–0 decision, which provoked the snap presidential election on 9 May. On 29 March, In announced he would step down by 31 March, the same date of the LKP presidential preselection where Hong Jun-pyo was elected LKP presidential candidate.

Chung returned as the interim President of the LKP and led the party at the presidential election on 9 May. Hong was defeated by Moon Jae-in, with only receiving 7,852,849 votes (24.03%). Chung's interim LKP presidency came to the end when Hong was elected president on 3 July.

Return to Opposition (2017-present) 
On 1 March 2020, the United Future Party (UFP) relocated Chung to Heungdeok for the 2020 election. He, however, lost to the former Minister of Culture, Sports and Tourism Do Jong-hwan.

On 27 December 2021, Chung announced he would contest at the 2022 Sangdang by-election, which was triggered following the election of Jeong Jeong-soon was declared void on 1 September. He won People Power Party (PPP) preselection, defeating Yoon Gap-geun. As the Democratic Party decided to not contest, Chung was expected to win uncontested, however, he faced a challenge from 3 independent candidates, including the Democrats-friendly Kim Shi-jean.

He made a successful return to the MP for Sangdang with about 56.9% of popular votes.

Political views 
A pro-Park Geun-hye figure, Chung was one of the 9 hardliner MPs revealed by the then Governor of Gyeonggi Nam Kyung-pil in 2016. In February 2017, he accused the 3 main opposition parties — Democratic Party, People's Party, and Justice Party, was threatening the Constitutional Court to uphold the impeachment.

He opposes the death penalty and same-sex marriage.

He is critical towards the Moon Jae-in government's nuclear power phase-out, saying that it will critically damage the overall industries of South Korea.

Controversies

Parliamentary assault incident 
On 19 September 1996, Chung provoked a controversy when he assaulted an NCNP MP Bang Yong-seok during a parliamentary session. During that time, Bang, who is 8 year older than Chung, was using informal language to Chung. Chung, however, could not handle his anger and smashed Bang's head for 3 times using a glass cup. Bang was severely injured and got an emergency treatment. Chung immediately apologised to Bang. People's Solidarity for Participatory Democracy (PSPD), a non-governmental organisation (NGO), condemned Chung and filed lawsuit against him 4 days later.

Remarks on Gyeongju earthquake 
On 12 September 2016, Chung made a Facebook post, where he wrote that the 2016 Gyeongju earthquake was due to North Korean nuclear test 3 days ago. He also added that the nuclear test also increased the possibility of the eruption of Mount Baekdu. Several netizens criticised him for relating both cases. 6 days later, Koh Yoon-hwa, the Head of the Korea Meteorological Administration, mentioned that both incidents are not related each other.

Sleeping at Memorial Day ceremony 
On 6 June 2017, Chung sparked another controversy when he was allegedly sleeping at the 62th Memorial Day Ceremony. While the President Moon Jae-in was delivering a speech, Chung was recorded sleeping, compared to others who were listening his speech. He denied that he was sleeping, but adding that he was just listening with closing his two eyes.

Personal life 
Chung married Lee Ok-bae and has 2 sons.

He is a Protestant, although he grew up in a strict Confucianist family.

Election history

General elections

Local elections

Governor of North Chungcheong

References

External links 
 Official website
 Chung Woo-taik on Facebook

1953 births
Living people
Governors of North Chungcheong Province
People Power Party (South Korea) politicians
Sungkyunkwan University alumni
Seoul National University alumni
University of Hawaiʻi alumni
Government ministers of South Korea
Deputy Speakers of the National Assembly (South Korea)